Glipostena dimorpha is a species of beetle in the genus Glipostena. It was discovered in 1999.

References

Mordellidae
Beetles described in 1999